Love for Love (Spanish: Amor con amor se paga) is a 1950 Mexican drama film directed by Ernesto Cortázar and starring Marga López, Antonio Badú and Víctor Junco.

The film's art direction was by Jorge Fernández.

Cast
 Marga López as Valentina Méndez 
 Antonio Badú 
 Víctor Junco 
 Lilia Prado 
 Alfredo Varela 
 Felipe de Alba 
 Arturo Soto Rangel
 Óscar Pulido 
 Conchita Gentil Arcos 
 José Muñoz 
 Armando Velasco
 Salvador Godínez
 Juan Orraca
 Salvador Quiroz
 Jorge Slim

References

Bibliography 
 Emilio García Riera. Historia documental del cine mexicano: 1949-1950. Universidad de Guadalajara, 1992.

External links 
 

1950 films
1950 drama films
Mexican drama films
1950s Spanish-language films
Films directed by Ernesto Cortázar
Mexican black-and-white films
1950s Mexican films